José Carlos Hernández is a Spanish long-distance runner. At the 2012 Summer Olympics, he competed in the Men's marathon, finishing in 34th place.

References

1978 births
Spanish male long-distance runners
Spanish male marathon runners
Living people
Olympic athletes of Spain
Athletes (track and field) at the 2012 Summer Olympics